Elections to Staffordshire County Council took place on 5 May 2005, the same day as the general election. All 62 seats were up for election.

Summary
The election was won by the Labour Party, with 32 seats.

Overall results

|}

References

Staffordshire
2005
2000s in Staffordshire